Caherelly is a civil parish in County Limerick, Ireland. Caherelly National School, also known as Scoil Ailbhe, is the local national (primary) school. The local Gaelic Athletic Association club, Ballybricken/Bohermore GAA Club, has its grounds in the area.

See also
 Ballybricken, a townland within the civil parish

References

Civil parishes of County Limerick